Leptysminae is a subfamily of spur-throat toothpick grasshoppers in the family Acrididae. There are at least 20 genera in Leptysminae, found in North, Central, and South America.

Genera
These 21 genera belong to the subfamily Leptysminae:

 Belosacris Rehn & Eades, 1961 c g
 Carbonellacris Roberts, 1977 c g
 Chloropseustes Rehn, 1918 c g
 Columbacris Bruner, 1911 c g
 Cornops Scudder, 1875 c g
 Cylindrotettix Bruner, 1906 c g
 Eumastusia Bruner, 1911 c g
 Guetaresia Rehn, 1929 c g
 Haroldgrantia Carbonell, Ronderos & Mesa, 1967 c g
 Leptysma Stål, 1873 i c g b
 Leptysmina Giglio-Tos, 1894 c g
 Mastusia Stål, 1878 c g
 Nadiacris Descamps & Amédégnato, 1972 c g
 Oxybleptella Giglio-Tos, 1894 c g
 Oxyphyma Saussure, 1861 c g
 Seabratettix Roberts, 1980 c g
 Stenacris Walker, 1870 i c g b
 Stenopola Stål, 1873 c g
 Tetrataenia Stål, 1873 c g
 Tucayaca Bruner, 1920 c g
 Xenismacris Descamps & Amédégnato, 1972 c g

Data sources: i = ITIS, c = Catalogue of Life, g = GBIF, b = Bugguide.net

References

Further reading

External links

 

Acrididae
Articles created by Qbugbot